Lamponoides is a monotypic genus of Australian white tailed spiders containing the single species, Lamponoides coottha. It was first described by Norman I. Platnick in 2000, and has only been found in Australia.

See also
 List of Lamponidae species

References

Lamponidae
Monotypic Araneomorphae genera
Spiders of Australia